The Liga de Voleibol Superior Masculino (LVSM) is a men's professional volleyball league in Puerto Rico. The competitions are organized by the Puerto Rican Volleyball Federation (Federación Puertorriqueña de Voleibol, FPV).

League Champions

References

External links
 Official website of Puerto Rican Volleyball Federation

LVSM
Puerto Rico
Sports leagues in Puerto Rico
Professional sports leagues in the United States
Professional sports leagues in Puerto Rico